Gremyashchy was the lead ship of the  of the Soviet Navy.

Construction and career
The ship was built at Zhdanov Shipyard in Leningrad and was launched on 30 April 1959 and commissioned into the Northern Fleet on 30 June 1960.

In the period from 1966 to 29 January 1968 at the Zhdanov Shipyard, she was modernized according to the project 57-A, as a result of which, on 20 January 1969, she was reclassified into a large anti-submarine ship (BOD).

From 14 to 27 May 1970, she undergone a refit.

She made a visit to Cuba, in 1971 - visits to Norway and the Netherlands. In the same year, while in the war zone, she performed combat missions to provide assistance to the armed forces of Egypt.

On 7 July 1987, She was decommissioned, disarmed and reclassified into an experimental vessel (OS).

On 25 August 1988, she was renamed OS-315.

On 2 October 1991, the former Gremyashchy was excluded from the lists of the Navy ships in connection with the transfer to the OFI for dismantling and sale.

In 1994, she was sold to a private Indian firm in India.

Gallery

References

In Russian

External links

 
 
Gallery of the ship. Navsource. Retrieved 11 August 2021

Ships built at Severnaya Verf
Kanin-class destroyers
1959 ships
Cold War destroyers of the Soviet Union